The Affairs of Maupassant is a 1935 Austrian-Italian drama film production. The German title is Das Tagebuch der Geliebten and the Italian title is Il diario di una donna amata, which means "the diary of a woman in love". An historical romance, it was directed by Henry Koster under his original name of Hermann Kosterlitz and starred Isa Miranda as the Ukrainian artist and diarist Marie Bashkirtseff and Hans Jaray as the French writer Guy de Maupassant. It was loosely based on Bashkirtseff's diaries, in which she records her studies in Paris to become an artist towards the end of the 19th century, and possibly on her correspondence with Maupassant, which she had begun under an assumed name. The film focuses on a feud between Maupassant and one of Bashkirtseff's teachers that leads to a nascent (and highly fictionalized) romance between Bashkirtseff and Maupassant. The romance is cut short in the film by Bashkirtseff's early death from tuberculosis. The film was made just before Koster moved to the United States to join Universal Studios. It was filmed in Vienna.

Cast (Italian version)
 Isa Miranda as Marie Bashkirtseff
 Hans Jaray as Guy de Maupassant
 Ennio Cerlesi as Bassieux 
 Loris Gizzi as Dr. Walitzky  
 Gemma Bolognesi as Marie's Mothera

Cast (Austrian version)
 Lili Darvas as Marie Bashkirtseff
 Hans Jaray as Guy de Maupassant
 Attila Hörbiger as Bassieux 
 S.Z. Sakall as Dr. Walitzky (as Szöke Szakall)
 Anna Kallina as Marie's Mother

References

External links

1935 films
1935 comedy films
1930s biographical films
Austrian comedy films
Italian comedy films
1930s German-language films
1930s Italian-language films
Films directed by Henry Koster
Films set in Paris
Films set in the 1880s
Biographical films about writers
Biographical films about poets
Films about tuberculosis
Italian multilingual films
Austrian multilingual films
Guy de Maupassant
Films scored by Paul Abraham
Cultural depictions of writers
Cultural depictions of poets
Cultural depictions of French men
Cultural depictions of Ukrainian women
Cultural depictions of 19th-century painters
Italian black-and-white films
1935 multilingual films